Florin Olteanu (born 30 June 1981) is a Romanian footballer who plays as a goalkeeper for Liga III side Cetatea Turnu Măgurele. In his career Olteanu also played for teams such as Astra Ploiești, Petrolul Ploiești, Jiul Petroșani, Unirea Alba Iulia, Săgeata Stejaru or Săgeata Năvodari, among others.

References

External links
 
 
 

1981 births
Living people
People from Alexandria, Romania
Romanian footballers
Association football goalkeepers
Liga I players
Liga II players
Liga III players
FC Astra Giurgiu players
CSO Plopeni players
FC Petrolul Ploiești players
CSM Jiul Petroșani players
CSM Unirea Alba Iulia players
AFC Săgeata Năvodari players